This article is a list of places of worship in Warsaw, Poland, both current and historical. It includes Catholic, Uniate, Protestant and Orthodox churches, as well as synagogues and shrines of other denominations. Note that the list includes also places of worship that were destroyed some time in the past and are currently non-existent. Throughout its existence, Warsaw has been a multi-cultural city. According to a census of 1901, out of 711,988 inhabitants there were 56.2% Catholics, 35.7% Jews, 5% Greek orthodox Christians and 2.8% Protestants. Eight years later, in 1909, there were 281,754 Jews (36.9%), 18,189 Protestants (2.4%) and 2,818 Mariavites (0.4%). This led to construction of hundreds of places of religious worship in all parts of the town. Most of them were destroyed in the aftermath of the Warsaw Uprising of 1944. After the war the new communist authorities of Poland discouraged church construction and only a small number of them were rebuilt.

The cathedrals and other main places of worship are bolded, non-existent churches are listed in italics.

Christian

Catholic 

 St. Alexander's Church on Plac Trzech Krzyży
 All Saints Church
 St. Ann's Church at Krakowskie Przedmieście, serving the academic community
 St. Anne's Church in Wilanów
 Church of St. Anthony of Padua in Czerniaków
 Church of St. Anthony of Padua in downtown Warsaw
 St. Augustine's Church
 Capuchins Church at Miodowa Street
 Carmelite Church
 St. Casimir's Church
 St. Catherine's Church
 Field Cathedral of the Polish Army
 St. Florian's Cathedral in the eastern borough of Praga
 St. Francis' Church
 Church of the Holiest Saviour at the square of the same name
 Holy Cross Church on Krakowskie Przedmieście
 Church of the Holy Spirit
 St. John's Cathedral
 Church of John the Baptist
 St. Martin's Church
 National Temple of Divine Providence (under construction)
 Church of the Nativity of the Blessed Virgin Mary
 Temple of Divine Providence in Wilanów (under construction since 1791)
 Church of the Visitation of the Blessed Virgin Mary
 Visitationist Church and  convent

Orthodox 
 Alexander Nevsky Cathedral at the Saxon Square (demolished between 1924 and 1926)
 Chapel of the Holy Mary Mother of God at Paryska street
 St. John Climacus's Orthodox Church at the Orthodox Cemetery in Wola
 St. Mary Magdalene's Cathedral in Praga
 Church of the Archangel Michael in Warsaw (demolished in 1923)
 St. Peter and Paul's Church in Wołomin

Protestant 
 Anglican Church of Warsaw in Krakowskie Przedmieście
 Baptist Church
 Calvinist Parochial Church
 Evangelical Reformed Parish
 International Christian Fellowship, Warsaw
 Lutheran Holy Trinity Church (so-called Zug's Church)
 Methodist Chapel at Plac Zbawiciela
 Pentecostal Church (Zbór Stołeczny)
 Seventh Day Adventist Church
 Warsaw International Church
 Warsaw Home Worship Group

Eastern Catholic
 Church of the Ascension of the Holy Mary of the Basilian monks at Miodowa street

Jewish 
 Great Synagogue (demolished in 1943)
 Nożyk Family Synagogue, the only synagogue to be rebuilt after the war
 Beit Warszawa Synagogue
 Chabad Lubavitch Synagogue

Muslim 
 Islamic Cultural Centre in Ochota
 Mosque in Wilanów

Hindu 

 Hindu Bhawan Temple
 Red Sues Temple in Sulejowek

See also 
 Tourist attractions in Warsaw
 Eastern Catholic Churches

References

Religious buildings and structures in Warsaw
Churches in Warsaw